The list below tries to collect, in chronological order, the major lexicons published in Hungary, but in Latin language, standalone or translated. The lexicons in Hungarian in Hungary are discussed in the article List of Hungarian lexicons. As Latin was the official state language in Hungary both in the Middle Ages and later (until 1844), many works were published in Latin. Some lexicons as well.

References

Sources 
 Kosáry Domokos: Bevezetés Magyarország történetének forrásaiba és irodalmába I., Tankönyvkiadó, Budapest, 1970, 119–123. o.

Another articles 
 List of Hungarian lexicons
 List of encyclopedias by language

Lists of encyclopedias